The 2003 European Ladies' Team Championship took place 8–12 July at Frankfurter Golf Club in Frankfurt am Main, Germany. It was the 23rd women's golf amateur European Ladies' Team Championship.

Venue 
The hosting Frankfurter Golf Club, one of the oldest golf clubs in Germany, was founded in 1913. The course, situated in Niederrad, 5 kilometres west of the city center of Frankfurt am Main, was designed by Harry Colt and opened in 1927.

The club had previously hosted twelve editions of the German Open during the period 1938–1989, a European Tour tournament since the tour was founded in 1972.

The championship course was set up with par 72.

Format 
All participating teams played two qualification rounds of stroke-play with six players, counted the five best scores for each team.

The eight best teams formed flight A, in knock-out match-play over the next three days. The teams were seeded based on their positions after the stroke-play. The first placed team was drawn to play the quarter final against the eight placed team, the second against the seventh, the third against the sixth and the fourth against the fifth. In each match between two nation teams, two 18-hole foursome games and five 18-hole single games were played. Teams were allowed to switch players during the team matches, selecting other players in to the afternoon single games after the morning foursome games. Games all square after 18 holes were declared halved, if the team match was already decided.

The six teams placed 9–14 in the qualification stroke-play formed flight B, to play similar knock-out match-play, to decide their final positions.

Teams 
14 nation teams contested the event. Each team consisted of six players.

Players in the leading teams

Other participating teams

Winners 
Team Spain lead  the opening 36-hole qualifying competition, with a score of 11 under par 709, one shot ahead of host nation Germany on second place.

Tied individual leaders in the 36-hole stroke-play competition was Tania Elósegui, Spain, and Pia Odefey, Germany, each with a score of 8 under par 136. Karin Sjödin, Sweden, shot a new course record 66 in the second round.

Team Spain won the championship, beating defending champions Sweden 4–2 in the final and earned their second title, playing in their fifth final. The win came to be the first of three in a row for Spain. Team France earned third place, beating Wales 4–2 in the bronze match.

Results 
Qualification round

Team standings

* Note: In the event of a tie the order was determined by the better total non-counting scores.

Individual leaders

 Note: There was no official award for the lowest individual score.

Flight A

Bracket

Final games

* Note: Game all square after 18 holes declared halved, since team match already decided.

Flight B

Bracket

Final standings

Sources:

See also 
 Espirito Santo Trophy – biennial world amateur team golf championship for women organized by the International Golf Federation.
 European Amateur Team Championship – European amateur team golf championship for men organised by the European Golf Association.

References

External links 
 European Golf Association: Results

European Ladies' Team Championship
Golf tournaments in Germany
European Ladies' Team Championship
European Ladies' Team Championship
European Ladies' Team Championship